Thomas Peter Odell (born 24 November 1990) is an English singer-songwriter. He released his debut extended play, Songs from Another Love, in 2012. It won the BRITs Critics' Choice Award in early 2013. Odell's debut studio album, Long Way Down, was issued on 24 June 2013. Three years later, his follow-up studio album, Wrong Crowd, was released, on 10 June 2016. This was followed by the release two years later, on 26 October 2018, of his third studio album, Jubilee Road. Monsters, his fourth album, was released on 9 July 2021, while his fifth album, Best Day Of My Life, was released the next year, on 28 October 2022.

Early life
Odell was born in Chichester, West Sussex, England, to an airline pilot father and a primary school teacher mother. He has an older sister. He spent part of his childhood in New Zealand because of his father's job. He was educated at Seaford College.

Throughout his school years, Odell wrote songs in a band that had trouble maintaining a lead singer. This trouble inspired him to start singing the songs he wrote, and Odell says he "sang [the songs] how [he] wanted them to sound" rather than worrying about someone else not bringing his vision to life.

At 18, Odell abandoned plans to attend the University of York and attempted to gain a place at a music college in Liverpool.  A year later, he moved back to Chichester after being made redundant from his job as a barman. Using his grandmother's car, he travelled regularly to London to play shows and to put advertisements in music schools. He studied at the British and Irish Modern Music Institute (BIMM) in Brighton playing as part of the band Tom & the Tides before moving to London where he decided to become a solo artist because he "didn't want to have to rely on people".

Career

2012–2013: Career beginnings and Long Way Down
Odell was signed to In the Name Of, an imprint of Columbia Records. He was discovered by the label head Lily Allen, who remarked that "his energy onstage reminded me of David Bowie". He released his debut extended play, Songs from Another Love, in October 2012. He made his television debut in November 2012 as a performer on Later... with Jools Holland; the show's producer Alison Howe later described it as "a classic Later debut". Odell was announced as one of 15 nominees for the BBC Sound of 2013 poll in January 2013. Also that month, his single "Another Love" was used by the BBC to advertise their 2013 schedule. Odell's music has been used in numerous Burberry fashion runway shows. He was named the BRITs' Critics' Choice Award winner, previously won by artists such as Adele and Florence and the Machine and was the first male artist to win the award, and was interviewed alongside previous winner Emeli Sandé during the television ceremony in February 2013.

Odell's debut album, Long Way Down, was released on 24 June 2013 and reached No. 1 in the UK Official Chart. He was due to support The Rolling Stones at London's Hyde Park on 13 July 2013, but was unable to perform because of illness.

2014–2015: Recognition

Odell performed his first new song since the release of Long Way Down, entitled "Alex", on 7 February 2014 at the Plymouth Pavilions. The show kicked off the last leg of his UK Long Way Down Tour.

Odell was named 'songwriter of the year' at the 2014 Ivor Novello Awards ceremony.
Odell's song "Can't Pretend" was used in the TV series The 100. "Can't Pretend" and "Long Way Down" were also featured on The Blacklist and the award winning movie The Fault In Our Stars. His song "Grow Old With Me" was featured in an episode of Reign.  The song was also featured in a major 60 second ad campaign for Kaiser Permanente entitled "Thrive".  His song "Heal" was also used in the movie If I Stay, the TV series NCIS,  The Vampire Diaries and Elementary along with "Another Love".

Odell's next song, a cover of "Real Love" by The Beatles, was the audio track to the 2014 John Lewis Christmas advert and gained him great publicity. Within hours of the advert being aired for the first time, the track reached to the top of the music recognition service Shazam's trending list. Within three days of release, it went straight to 21 in the UK top 40, peaking at 7.

Odell's music was featured in a Sony advert in 2016, with a cover of "True Colours" by Cyndi Lauper.

2016–2017: Wrong Crowd
Odell began working on his second studio album in 2015, and played a variety of new songs at Forest Live, a concert series in England's forests by the Forestry Commission. On 4 April 2016, the first single, "Wrong Crowd", was released, and an upcoming second studio album of the same name was announced. In addition, Odell announced that he would be going on tour in the US and Europe. On 15 April 2016, the second single from the album, "Magnetised", was released. The next day, Odell revealed that his sold-out shows were titled the No Bad Days Tour, which kicked off on 20 April 2016 in London. The full album was released on 10 June 2016. In an interview with Holly Willoughby and Phillip Schofield on This Morning, Odell revealed that in some countries outside the UK, audiences have misunderstood the title of the album to be an insult, that they are in fact a bad crowd or so to speak the 'wrong crowd'.

2017–2020: Jubilee Road

On his No Bad Days tour, Odell revealed he was writing for his third album and played several new songs live. In November 2017, he toured Germany on the New Fall Festival in Düsseldorf and Stuttgart and announced that the album had been finished and a first single was to be released imminently. On 20 December 2017 Odell announced in an interview on BBC Radio 2 that the album was scheduled for release in mid-2018. On 14 June 2018, the first single from the album, "If You Wanna Love Somebody", was released worldwide. The album, Jubilee Road, was released on 26 October.

Jubilee Road was inspired by his past neighbours and community. The title "Jubilee Road" is supposed to be a reference to a terraced street in east London that Odell lived on, but when he asked his neighbours if he could use the real name, they responded that they were afraid it would become a tourist destination and would rather him create a fictional name.

2021–present: Monsters and Best Day of My Life
"Numb", the first single from Odell's fourth album, was released in February 2021. In an interview with The Gentleman's Journal on 27 February 2021, it was revealed that Odell's fourth studio album is titled Monsters. He stated that the album would feature darker, electro-pop tones, and the lyrics were inspired by artists such as XXXTentacion, Drake and Travis Scott. The second single from the album, "Monster v.1", was released in March 2021. The record touches on heavy subjects and rough experiences he had during a "fever pitch" in his life, particularly struggling with anxiety and panic attacks. The album was released on 9 July 2021.

On 8 September 2022, Odell announced the release of his fifth studio album, Best Day of My Life, scheduled for release on 28 October 2022. The album was preceded by the singles "Best Day of My Life", "Sad Anymore", "Flying" and "Smiling All the Way Back Home".

Influences
Odell grew up listening to Elton John. One of the first albums he listened to was Goodbye Yellow Brick Road (1973). He also cites David Bowie, Jeff Buckley, Bob Dylan, Arthur Russell, Leonard Cohen, Leon Russell, Billy Joel, Randy Newman, Tom Waits, Rodríguez and Bruce Springsteen as influences. He is a fan of Arcade Fire, Adele, James Blake, Cat Power, Blur, Beach House, Radiohead, Coldplay and Ben Folds.

Odell has said his lyrics are inspired by his "inability to sustain a relationship with someone for longer than six months." He says, "I find that I write much better songs when I'm being honest, and writing about things that happen to me. It can get a little weird though, when friends or girlfriends work out that a song is about them. But it's amazing what you can get away with it. Artistic license, I think they call it."

Activism 
In July 2020, he signed an open letter to the UK Equalities minister Liz Truss calling for a ban on all forms of LGBT+ conversion therapy.

Discography

Studio albums

Extended plays

Singles

Promotional singles

Other certified songs

Guest appearances

Tours and concerts
Long Way Down Tour (2013)
No Bad Days Tour (2016-2017)
Jubilee Road Tour (2018-2019)

Awards and nominations

Notes

References

External links

 

1990 births
Living people
People from Chichester
21st-century English singers
21st-century pianists
British male singers
English male singer-songwriters
Brit Award winners
Ivor Novello Award winners
People educated at Seaford College
Male pianists